Ridgmar Mall is an enclosed shopping mall in Fort Worth, Texas. It opened in 1976 at 1888 Green Oaks Road and Interstate 30. It is owned by GK Development, Inc., includes four anchor stores: Dillard's Clearance Center, JCPenney, Rave Cinemas and Right Move Storage with two vacant anchors last occupied by Sears, and Neiman Marcus. It was recognized as the main shopping destination in Fort Worth, also serving other rural areas within proximity to Fort Worth.

History 

Ridgmar Mall opened in 1976 with Dillard's, JCPenney, and Neiman Marcus as the original anchors. Sears was added the following year. Foley's was added in 1998 and was converted to Macy's in 2006. Rave Cinemas opened in the 2000s.

In 2013, GK Development acquired the property, with plans to redevelop the property into a mixed use development.

In 2016, a 20,693 square foot H&M store would be dedicated; it would open as the city's first.

On January 6, 2016, it was announced that Macy's would be closing in early Spring 2016 in a corporate effort to cut operating costs.

In March 2016, Dillard's was converted to a clearance center.

In October 2016, the 120,000 square foot Neiman Marcus space was acquired by GK Development; with plans for its redevelopment being announced online.

In early 2017, a three phase renovation commenced, which would involve adding a new coat of paint, new light fixtures, new railings and a $3,000,000 renovation of its Rave Cinemas.

On January 28, 2017, Neiman Marcus relocated to a smaller location in The Shops At Clearfork.

By the end of 2017, a 27,000 square foot SeaQuest aquarium opened to visitors.

Although the mall faces three vacant anchor tenant spaces, Athletic Apex has acquired a portion of the vacant Neiman Marcus space and has planned to open a 60,000 square foot location at some point in the future.

On May 31, 2018, it was announced that Sears would also be closing as part of a plan to close 72 stores nationwide. The store closed in September 2018.

On July 31, 2020, JCPenney put 21 stores up for sale, this one included.

Around July 2020, a self storage company by the name of Right Move Storage bought out the space formerly occupied by the Macys store, renovating the store into a Self storage facility.

In April 2021, Tarrant County health officials converted a space in the mall formerly occupied by H&M into a site to administer vaccines for COVID-19.

Anchor Tenants 
Dillard's Clearance Center  (2016-present)
JCPenney (1976-present)
Rave Cinemas (2000s-present)
Right Move Storage (2020s-present)

Former Anchor Tenants 
Dillard's (1976-2016)
Foley's (1998-2006)
Macy's (2006-2016)
Neiman Marcus (1976-2017)
Sears (1977-2018)

References

External links

Shopping malls in the Dallas–Fort Worth metroplex
Shopping malls established in 1976